Redding is an American indie rock band from Belleville, Illinois, near St. Louis, Missouri. Redding take their name from the character Ellis Redding (played by Morgan Freeman) in the film The Shawshank Redemption.

The band consists of:
Joey Graves: lead vocals, guitar
Jeff McCullough: bass guitar, piano/keyboard, backing vocals
Danny Gula: guitar
Jon Stamm: drums/percussion

History

Origin and early years  (1999 – 2003) 

Learning to play music together in middle school, Joey Graves, Jon Stamm, and Danny Gula donned the name For the Moment for their developing garage band. Graves found himself at the helm of writing and recording the music (in the band’s home studio), and Stamm wrote the majority of the lyrics. In the spring of 2004, the trio began work on a four-song EP album. Graves tapped his first cousin, Jeff McCullough, to join the band and play bass guitar and piano. McCullough’s formal music training and experience in previous bands allowed him to become a major creative force in the developing group.

Sinclair Aircraft EP  (2004)

On May 8, 2004 (two weeks before Graves, Stamm, and Gula graduated high school), For the Moment released the resultant home-recordings as an album called Sinclair Aircraft EP. The band sold all 300 copies before school ended. Most importantly, a copy of the Sinclair Aircraft EP came to the attention of Tom Derr (owner of Rock Ridge Music, who expressed interest in signing For the Moment to his label. But first, Derr and co-owner Chris Henderson (guitarist in alternative rock group 3 Doors Down) requested additional music. The band quickly wrote and recorded an early version of “Gleam”, which helped seal a contract with Rock Ridge Music. In the fall, Graves, Gula, and Stamm started school at Southwestern Illinois College as music majors.

Redding  (2005 - 2008)

On January 5, 2005, the band changed its name to Redding, and began a recording session at Chris Henderson’s Rivergate Studios in Biloxi, Mississippi. Kirk Kelsey (producer, Creed) produced, engineered, and mixed the project. On August 6, the band performed at the Verizon Wireless Amphitheater for a crowd of nearly 20,000 before Staind and 3 Doors Down. In the week following, and again in October, Redding resumed and then completed recording at Greenville College. The band’s eponymous eight track debut album was released on July 11, 2006.  It contains two re-recorded tracks from the Sinclair Aircraft EP -- “All I Can Hold” and “What You’ve Become”. A month later, Graves, Stamm, and Gula began studying Digital Media at Greenville College (the program from which McCullough had graduated in 2003).

Discography
 Redding (2006)
 Through the Cold - Single (2013)

References

 Redding biography on Artist Direct
 Redding album review by Playback:stl

External links
 Official Website
 Redding on Facebook

Indie rock musical groups from Illinois
Musical groups established in 1999
1999 establishments in Illinois